Armando Frigo (5 August 1917 – 10 September 1943) was an Italian-American football (soccer) player who played as a midfielder. He was known as the second American-born player after Alfonso Negro to have played in Serie A.

Early life
Frigo was born in Clinton, Indiana, from Italian parents. When he was eight, his family decided to relocate to Vicenza, where he grew up.

Football career
Frigo started with his hometown team Vicenza in Serie C. He was transferred to Fiorentina for the 1937–39 season, where he played 21 games and scored five goals. He went on to play a total of 46 games and scored seven goals. At the end of the 1941-42 season, he moved on to play for Spezia in Serie B.

Death
Armando Frigo served as a second lieutenant in the Italian Army infantry during World War II. When Italy entered civil war following armistice with the Allies, he joined the partisans. In September 1943 he was captured by the Nazis near the town of Crkvice and shot to death. In his wallet was found his Fiorentina membership card.

References

 Profile at L'enciclopedia del calcio
 

1917 births
1943 deaths
Italian footballers
American expatriate soccer players
L.R. Vicenza players
ACF Fiorentina players
Spezia Calcio players
Serie A players
Serie B players
People from Clinton, Indiana
American emigrants to Italy
American soccer players
Association football midfielders
Italian military personnel of World War II
Italian civilians killed in World War II
Resistance members killed by Nazi Germany
Italian partisans